Gregory Allen King (born 7 August 1973) is a South African former first-class cricketer who later became the fitness coach for India and South Africa national cricket teams.  He was the fitness trainer to Chennai Super Kings from 2008 to 2015 and in 2018. 

He played three first-class games for Border B in the 1995–96 season.

King took a post-graduate degree in Human Kinetics and Ergonomics from King Edward VII, St John's College, Rhodes University.

References

Living people
1973 births
South African cricketers
Border cricketers